Matthew Thomas Pennycook (born 29 October 1982) is a British politician who has served as Member of Parliament (MP) for Greenwich and Woolwich since 2015. A member of the Labour Party, he has been Shadow Minister for Housing and Planning since 2021.

Early life 
Pennycook was born on 29 October 1982, and was raised in a single-parent family in South London. He was educated at Beverley Boys Secondary School, a comprehensive school in New Malden, London. He joined the Labour Party at the age of nineteen.

Pennycook studied History and International Relations at the London School of Economics and Political Science, graduating with a first-class Bachelor of Arts (BA) degree in 2005. He was awarded the CS MacTaggart Scholarship Prize for best overall degree performance in any subject. He subsequently won a scholarship to attend Balliol College, Oxford, studying for a Master of Philosophy (MPhil) degree in International Relations.

Early career 
While still a student, he volunteered with the Child Poverty Action Group and worked with then-Chief Executive, Kate Green, who became a Labour MP. Before becoming an MP himself, Pennycook worked for a number of charitable and voluntary organisations including at the Fair Pay Network and the Resolution Foundation where he led on issues relating to welfare reform, low pay and working poverty.  He also worked for a while in Parliament as an assistant to Labour MP Karen Buck.

Pennycook was a Labour councillor for Greenwich West from 2010 to 2015, resigning in March 2015 just before the general election. He also served as a trustee of Greenwich Housing Rights and was a school governor at James Wolfe Primary School in West Greenwich. He has written multiple articles for The Guardian about the need for a living wage in the UK and has served on the Living Wage Foundation's advisory board.

Parliamentary career
In November 2013, he was selected as the official Labour Party candidate for Greenwich and Woolwich, as the sitting MP, Nick Raynsford was retiring.

In May 2015, he retained the seat for Labour with a majority of 11,946 votes and a 52.2% share of the vote on a turnout of 63.7%. This was a 3% increase on Nick Raynsford's previous majority five years earlier. He gave his maiden speech in the House of Commons during a debate on the economy on 4 June 2015.

In the leadership election following Labour's defeat at the 2015 general election, Pennycook endorsed Yvette Cooper and for the deputy leadership his preference was for Tom Watson. He supported Sadiq Khan in the campaign for selection of the candidate for the 2016 London Mayoral election.

In July 2015, Pennycook became a member of the Energy and Climate Change Select Committee. He served as Parliamentary Private Secretary to Shadow Minister of State for Housing, John Healey MP from 2015, resigning from the position in June 2016.

He was one of 161 Labour MPs who backed Owen Smith in his unsuccessful Labour Party leadership campaign to replace Jeremy Corbyn in September 2016.

Pennycook campaigned in favour of a "Remain" vote for the 2016 referendum on EU membership and his Greenwich and Woolwich constituency voted 64% to remain. After the referendum results were announced, Pennycook was appointed one of the Shadow Ministers for Brexit in October 2016, and, in accordance with the Labour Party whip, voted for the Bill to trigger Article 50. In September 2019, he resigned as shadow Brexit minister in order to campaign actively in favour of holding a second referendum and unequivocally for the UK to stay in the EU.

Pennycook returned to the Opposition frontbench as Shadow Minister for Climate Change, following Keir Starmer's victory in the 2020 Labour Party leadership election. In the December 2021 frontbench reshuffle, he was appointed Shadow Minister for Housing and Planning.

Views
Pennycook has expressed concerns about newly qualified teachers leaving the profession. Over a quarter of teachers who started working in London schools in 2015 had left by November 2017 and in October 2018 it was reported that more than a third of teachers starting work in London leave before four years have passed. Pennycook stated, "The crisis in teacher retention in London did not begin the day before yesterday, yet this Tory government still has no coherent plan to address the problem and no appetite to get to grips with the underlying drivers – workload, stagnant pay, rising living costs and a lack of genuinely affordable housing to rent and buy – that lie behind this worrying trend."

Personal life
Pennycook is married to civil servant Joanna Otterburn and they have two children.

References

External links
 Matthew Pennycook official website
 

1982 births
Living people
Labour Party (UK) MPs for English constituencies
Politics of the Royal Borough of Greenwich
UK MPs 2015–2017
UK MPs 2017–2019
UK MPs 2019–present
Alumni of the London School of Economics
Alumni of Balliol College, Oxford